Jacques Brunhes (7 October 1934 – 30 September 2020) was a French politician. A member of the French Communist Party, he served Hauts-de-Seine in the National Assembly from 1978 to 1986. Brunhes returned to the National Assembly in 1988, and served until 2001, when he was appointed Minister of Tourism. His tenure as government minister ended in 2002, and he was reelected a deputy until 2007.

Early life and education
Brunhes was born in Paris, and was the son of a taxi driver. After studying at the École normale d'instituteurs d’Auteuil, he obtained a teaching license in the 18th arrondissement of Paris.

Career 
In 1962, he became a professor of history and geography in Villeneuve-la-Garenne.

Brunhes was elected to the National Assembly in 1978, representing Hauts-de-Seine's 1st constituency. During his terms, he served as Secretary of the Assembly, Vice-President, and quaestor. Additionally, he chaired the friendship groups between France, Vietnam, and Cambodia. From 2002 to 2007, he was a member of the Study Group on the Question of Tibet.

In addition to his time in the National Assembly, Brunhes served as Mayor of Gennevilliers and a General Councillor for Hauts-de-Seine. He was also appointed by Jacques Chirac to serve as Minister of Tourism from 2001 to 2002.

Personal life 
Jacques Brunhes died on 30 September 2020 at the age of 85.

Awards and honours
Knight of the Legion of Honour (2008)

References

1934 births
2020 deaths
French Ministers of Tourism
Deputies of the 7th National Assembly of the French Fifth Republic
Deputies of the 6th National Assembly of the French Fifth Republic
Deputies of the 9th National Assembly of the French Fifth Republic
Deputies of the 10th National Assembly of the French Fifth Republic
Deputies of the 11th National Assembly of the French Fifth Republic
Deputies of the 12th National Assembly of the French Fifth Republic
French general councillors
Mayors of places in Île-de-France
Chevaliers of the Légion d'honneur
French Communist Party politicians
Politicians from Paris
Deaths from cerebrovascular disease